Sleeper is a studio album by the Boston alternative band Tribe, released in 1993. It was the band's final album.

The album was recorded and mixed at Blue Jay Recording Studio in Carlisle, Massachusetts, from December 1992 to January 1993.

The album spawned two singles, "Supercollider" and "Red Rover", the former of which also spawned the band's second (and last) music video.

The band performed "Supercollider" on Late Night with Conan O'Brien in January 1994, marking the band's only ever national television appearance.

Critical reception

The Boston Globe deemed the album "an uneven effort, hampered by an often poor sound mix in which Janet LaValley's ... vocals are mixed too low, muting her power and rendering many lyrics inaudible."

Track listing

Band Line-Up
 Janet LaValley: vocals, rhythm guitar
 Terri Brosius: keyboard, backing vocals (lead vocals on "Mr. Lieber")
 Eric Brosius: lead guitar, backing vocals
 Greg LoPiccolo: bass, backing vocals
 David Penzo: drums, percussion

References

Tribe (band) albums
1993 albums